The deputy secretary-general of the United Nations is the deputy to the secretary-general of the United Nations. The office was created to handle many of the administrative responsibilities of the secretary-general, help manage Secretariat operations, and ensure coherence of activities and programs. The post was formally established by the General Assembly at the end of 1997.

Amina J. Mohammed of Nigeria was named as deputy secretary-general by then secretary-general-designate António Guterres. Mohammed assumed the office the same day as Guterres began his term, on 1 January 2017.

Responsibilities

Responsibilities generally delegated by the secretary-general to the deputy secretary-general include:

(a) To assist the Secretary-General in managing the operations of the Secretariat;
(b) To act for the Secretary-General at United Nations Headquarters in the absence of the Secretary-General and in other cases as may be decided by the Secretary-General;
(c) To support the Secretary-General in ensuring inter-sectoral and inter-institutional coherence of activities and programs and to support the Secretary-General in elevating the profile and leadership of the United Nations in the economic and social spheres, including further efforts to strengthen the United Nations as a leading centre for development policy and development assistance;
(d) To represent the Secretary-General at conferences, official functions and ceremonial and other occasions as may be decided by the Secretary-General;
(e) To undertake such assignments as may be determined by the Secretary-General;

The director in the Office of the Deputy Secretary-General is a sitting observer of the United Nations Development Group.

History
Canadian Louise Fréchette was the first deputy secretary-general of the United Nations, holding the position from 1998 to 2005. She was appointed to the post by Secretary-General Kofi Annan and assumed her duties on 2 March 1998. In 2005, partly in response to criticism by former U.S. Federal Reserve Chairman Paul Volcker for failed management of the Iraq Oil-for-Food Programme, Frechette announced her resignation. She remained at her post until 31 March 2006.

On 3 March 2006 it was announced that Mark Malloch Brown from the United Kingdom would succeed Louise Fréchette as deputy secretary-general on 1 April 2006. Brown left his post concurrent with Kofi Annan's departure as secretary-general on 31 December 2006.

List of deputy secretaries-general

References

External links
UN Deputy Secretary-General

United Nations Development Group
United Nations Secretariat
Secretaries-General of the United Nations
Deputy Secretaries-General of the United Nations